The 1960 United States presidential election in Arizona took place on November 8, 1960, as part of the 1960 United States presidential election. State voters chose four representatives, or electors, to the Electoral College, who voted for president and vice president.

Arizona was won by incumbent Vice President Richard Nixon (R–California), running with United States Ambassador to the United Nations Henry Cabot Lodge, Jr., with 55.5% of the popular vote, against Senator John F. Kennedy (D–Massachusetts), running with Senator Lyndon B. Johnson, with 44.4% of the popular vote.

This was the first time since achieving statehood in 1912 that Arizona backed the losing candidate in a presidential election, a sign that the state was trending Republican. It would vote Republican in every election thereafter except 1996 and 2020. Kennedy became the first ever Democrat to win the White House without carrying Arizona since it became a state, as well as the first to do so without carrying Apache, Cochise, Coconino, Graham, Maricopa, Mohave, Navajo, or Yavapai Counties, and the first since Woodrow Wilson in 1916 to do so without carrying Pima County.

Primaries

Democratic state convention

While Arizona did not hold a formal primary to select delegates to represent the state at the Democratic National Convention, it did hold a state convention in April where delegates were selected.

Since Arizona traditionally operated under the "unit role" at conventions (under which the entire delegation voted for one candidate as a unified bloc), a candidate who could secure a simple majority of their delegation's support would be able to receive the votes of all 17 delegates.

By early 1959, Kennedy's campaign saw strong potential in the state, and recognized a need to organize their efforts there. Arizona was added to the list of states which they began to prioritize as targets for Kennedy to compete in during the primaries. As the primary season unfolded, Kennedy increasingly recognized the state convention as an opportunity to secure delegates in advance of the convention.  This arose as an opportunity for Kennedy due to Lyndon B. Johnson's steadfast refusal to launch an active candidacy during the primaries. Rather than seeking support as a declared candidate, Johnson was relying on a covert, ultimately ineffective, effort to deliver him the support of Arizona's delegation. Johnson was counting on 81 year old senator Carl Hayden and former senator Ernest McFarland to deliver him the state's delegation. Both would ultimately prove to have long since expended their political capital in the state.

Kennedy operative Ted Sorensen found, early on, that the state party chairman, Tucson mayor Don Hummel, was willing to help the Kennedy campaign. Kennedy's campaign's primary base for their Arizona operations was in Pima County, where Hummel lent his grassroots prowess to them.

The primary actor in shoring up Kennedy's support in the state, however, was congressman Stewart Udall. Both Udall and his prover, former county prosecutor Mo Udall, proved themselves to be committed supporters of Kennedy's campaign. A few days prior to the state convention, Sam Rayburn (a Johnson ally) summoned Stewart Udall to the Speaker's Platform in the House Chamber of the United States Capitol. He inquired as to whether Udall was going to be an active figure in the state convention, which Udall confirmed that he would be. Rayburn responded sternly, "Well, I have a candidate for the nomination, my colleague from Texas. I don't want you to hurt him." Udall attempted to placate Rayburn by saying, "Mr. Speaker, I am not trying to hurt anybody. I committed myself several months ago to John Kennedy, and I am going to do everything I can to help him. I am not trying to hurt your man. As a matter of fact, if Kennedy can't get the support, your man is obviously the man who will. If I can't put Kennedy over, I'm not going against him."

After a string of hostile caucuses to select delegates, the state convention ultimately produced a delegation that favored Kennedy (with two-thirds of the delegates being Kennedy supporters).

Results

Results by county

References

Arizona
1960
1960 Arizona elections